Julian Smith (born 1972 in Mount Kisco, New York) is an American author and journalist. He wrote Crossing the Heart of Africa, published in 2010 by Harper Perennial, and co-authored Smokejumper: A Memoir by One of America's Most Select Airborne Firefighters, published in 2015 by William Morrow. Smith and David Wolman are also co-authors of Aloha Rodeo: Three Hawaiian Cowboys, the World's Greatest Rodeo, and a Hidden History of the American West, coming May 28, 2019 from William Morrow.

Background
After growing up in Katonah, New York, he studied biology at the University of Virginia and wildlife ecology at Utah State University. He later helped launch and edit Frontiers in Ecology and the Environment, an international peer-reviewed scientific journal. He has taught writing, editing, and literature at the College of Santa Fe and the Gotham Writers Workshop. The father of two daughters, Smith lives in Portland, Oregon.

Writing career
Smith has written for numerous publications, including Smithsonian, Wired, Outside, National Geographic Adventure, National Geographic Traveler, New Scientist, U.S. News & World Report, USA Today, the Los Angeles Times, Wend Magazine and The Washington Post.

Smith is the author of travel guidebooks to Virginia, Ecuador, and the US Southwest for Moon Publications. In 2004, his book Moon Handbooks Four Corners won the country’s top travel writing award from the Society of American Travel Writers.

In December 2010, Harper Perennial published his book Crossing the Heart of Africa: An Odyssey of Love and Adventure, an account of retracing the 1898-1900 route of British explorer Ewart Grogan across Africa. In 2007, Smith traveled from South Africa to Sudan, crossing eight countries in two months by bus, bicycle and ferry. Grogan's journey was itself the first transect of the continent from south to north, done in part to convince his beloved's stepfather that he was worth marrying.

Through Jason Ramos' eyes, Smokejumper: A Memoir by One of America's Most Select Airborne Firefighters provides an intimate look at the lives and history of smokejumpers, elite airborne firefighters who combat wildfires in remote and rugged areas of the United States.

The upcoming Aloha Rodeo: Three Hawaiian Cowboys, the World's Greatest Rodeo, and a Hidden History of the American West charts the lost story of native Hawaiian cowboys who became rodeo champions in 1908, upending the American West's traditional narrative.

Smith is also executive editor at Atellan, a Portland-based story studio.

Published works

As co-author or contributor
 1000 Things to See Before You Die: USA and Canada
 Moon Handbooks Chesapeake Bay
 Grzimek’s Animal Life Encyclopedia
 Road Trip USA
 Road Trip USA California and the Southwest
 Online Travel Planning for Dummies

As author
 Moon Handbooks Galapagos
 Moon Handbooks Navajo & Hopi Country
 Moon Handbooks Northern Virginia
 Moon Handbooks Four Corners
 Moon Handbooks Virginia
 Moon Handbooks Ecuador
 On Your Own in El Salvador

References

External links 
 
 
 Julian Smith author page at Amazon.com
 Frontiers in Ecology and the Environment
 "Julian Smith travels from South Africa to Sudan on the trail of British explorer Ewart Grogan," The Oregonian 12/3/10

1972 births
Living people
American travel writers
American male non-fiction writers
Writers from Portland, Oregon
University of Virginia alumni
Utah State University alumni
People from Mount Kisco, New York
People from Katonah, New York